James Daniel Bridges Jr. (born September 15, 1960 in San Francisco, California) is an American actor. He is the son of Betty A. Bridges, an actress, and James Bridges Sr. His siblings are Todd Bridges of Diff'rent Strokes, and Verda Bridges. He has five children, including actress Brooke Marie Bridges.

Filmography

Film

Television

References

External links

1960 births
Living people
African-American male actors
20th-century American male actors
American male film actors
Male actors from San Francisco
American male television actors
21st-century American male actors
20th-century African-American people
21st-century African-American people